Nikola Vukčević (born 13 December 1991), also known as Điđo (Ђиђо), is a Montenegrin professional footballer who plays as a defensive midfielder for Qatar Stars League side Al-Ahli. Vukčević began his professional career with Budućnost. He debuted for the Montenegro national team in 2014.

Club career

Budućnost
From 2010 to 2013, Vukčević played for local club Budućnost, where he earned 65 caps and scored four goals. During the 2011–12 season, he emerged as one of the best youngsters in the country, and became Budućnost's captain during their title run. In the following season, Vukčević became the most valuable player in Budućnost squad, starting in 27 out of 33 league matches - the most appearances he made during one season at the time. His good performances earned him a starting spot in Montenegro's U21 selection.

Braga
Vukčević left Budućnost as a free agent due to the expiration of his contract. In September 2013, he signed for Braga, and initially made appearances for their reserve team.

He made his debut for the club in a 3–0 win against Vitória S.C., coming on as a 91st-minute substitute for Felipe Pardo in the Minho derby. He became a regular substitute on Braga's first squad and would occasionally start in matches of Taça de Portugal and Taça da Liga.

Levante
On 9 August 2018, Vukčević moved to Spanish club Levante for a €8.9 million fee and signed a four-year contract.

International career
In August 2012 he participated in the Valeri Lobanovsky Memorial Tournament 2012, where his team lost in the final to  Slovakia on penalties and took home silver medals.

Vukčević made his debut against Ghana on 5 March 2014 in a friendly 1–0 win. Though he started the match, Nemanja Nikolić substituted him in the 65th minute. As of 19 October 2020, he has earned a total of 44 caps, scoring 1 goal.

International goals
Scores and results list Montenegro's goal tally first.

Honours
Budućnost Podgorica
 Prva CFL: 2011–12
 Montenegrin Cup: 2012–13

Braga
Taça de Portugal: 2015–16

References

External links

1991 births
Living people
Footballers from Podgorica
Association football midfielders
Montenegrin footballers
Montenegro under-21 international footballers
Montenegro international footballers
FK Budućnost Podgorica players
S.C. Braga B players
S.C. Braga players
Levante UD footballers
Al Ahli SC (Doha) players
Montenegrin First League players
Primeira Liga players
Liga Portugal 2 players
La Liga players
Qatar Stars League players
Montenegrin expatriate footballers
Expatriate footballers in Portugal
Montenegrin expatriate sportspeople in Portugal
Expatriate footballers in Spain
Montenegrin expatriate sportspeople in Spain
Expatriate footballers in Qatar
Montenegrin expatriate sportspeople in Qatar